Kial Douglas Stewart, OAM (born 26 July 1983)  is an Australian Paralympic tandem cyclist, who was Anthony Biddle's pilot at the 2004 Athens Games. He was born in Canberra, Australian Capital Territory. At the games, he won a gold medal in the Men's 1 km Time Trial Tandem B1–3 event, for which he received a Medal of the Order of Australia, and a bronze medal in the Men's Sprint Tandem B1–3 event.

References

Paralympic cyclists of Australia
Cyclists at the 2004 Summer Paralympics
Paralympic gold medalists for Australia
Paralympic bronze medalists for Australia
Paralympic sighted guides
Recipients of the Medal of the Order of Australia
Living people
Medalists at the 2004 Summer Paralympics
1983 births
ACT Academy of Sport alumni
Australian male cyclists
Paralympic medalists in cycling